Casselton Robert Miller Regional Airport  is a public airport located  south of the central business district of Casselton, in Cass County, North Dakota, United States. It is owned by the Casselton Regional Airport Authority.

Facilities and aircraft

For the 12-month period ending October 20, 1999, the airport had 15,450 aircraft operations: 97% general aviation, 3% air taxi, and less than 1% military.

See also 
 List of airports in North Dakota

References

External links 
 Casselton Robert Miller Regional (5N8) at North Dakota Aeronautics Commission

Airports in North Dakota
Buildings and structures in Cass County, North Dakota
Transportation in Cass County, North Dakota